Anthony Branch is a stream in Oregon County in the Ozarks of southern Missouri. It is a tributary of the Warm Fork Spring River.

The stream source area lies south of Missouri Route P about 5 miles west of Alton. The stream flows south-southeast for about six miles and joins the Warm Fork about 4.5 miles north of Thayer.

Anthony Branch, historically called "Anthony Creek", has the name of the local Anthony family.

See also
List of rivers of Missouri

References

Rivers of Oregon County, Missouri
Rivers of Missouri